Leandro Gil Miranda da Silva (born 19 April 1978), known as just Leandro, is a Brazilian footballer who started his career with Bangu Atlético Clube.

Leandro signed a contract with Esporte Clube Barreira from April to July 2005.

Leandro finished as the runner-up of 2005–06 Albanian Cup.
He signed a contract with Duque de Caxias in April 2007, last until the end of year. He won 2007–08 Albanian Cup.

References

External links
 
 

1978 births
Living people
Brazilian footballers
Bangu Atlético Clube players
KF Vllaznia Shkodër players
Kategoria Superiore players
Brazilian expatriate footballers
Expatriate footballers in Albania
Brazilian expatriate sportspeople in Albania
Association football midfielders
Footballers from Rio de Janeiro (city)